The EuroHockey Nations Challenge is a competition run by the European Hockey Federation for European national field hockey teams. There are Challenges for outdoor and indoor hockey for both men's and women's sides. The Challenges precede the current EuroHockey Nations Trophy, which itself precedes the EuroHockey Nations Championship. Teams can gain promotion and relegation from their divisions based on their final standings.

Outdoor

Men

Championship

Championship II 

(known as EuroHockey Nations Trophy until 2011)

Championship III  

(known as Challenge I until 2011)

Championship IV 
(known as Challenge II until 2011)

Women

Championship

Championship II

Championship III

(known as Challenge I until 2011)

Indoor

Men

Championship I
See: EuroHockey Indoor Nations Championship

Championship II
(Known as Indoor Nations Trophy until 20??)

Championship III
(Known as Challenge I until 20??)

Championship IV

Women

Championship I

Championship II

Championship III

References

!